Pacific Bondi Beach is an indoor/outdoor shopping centre in the suburb of Bondi Beach in the Eastern Suburbs of Sydney.

Transport 

The Eastern Suburbs railway line offer frequent services to Bondi Junction station which is a short bus ride from the centre.

Pacific Bondi Beach has Transdev John Holland bus connections to the Eastern Suburbs, as well as local surrounding suburbs

Pacific Bondi Beach has a car park with 150 spaces.

History 
The Swiss Grand Hotel opened in the 1980s on Campbell Parade, opposite the beach. It was built on the site of an old service station that had been derelict for many years.

The Swiss Grand Hotel featured 13 stores and was the first site of where Bondi Pizza was founded in 2009.

In 2007 Swiss Grand Hotel was purchased by developer for an undisclosed sum and planned a development for the site. Construction commenced in 2013 on the Pacific Bondi Beach development in which the 13 stores closed including Bondi Pizza.

This development included the demolition of the Grand Swiss Hotel in which the concrete structure remained. 

Pacific Bondi Beach was completed in 2015 in which the QT Hotel featuring 69 hotel rooms and the 112 residential apartments opened. Saturdays Surf NYC opened their first Australian flagship store on 21 November 2015. Woolworths Metro, BWS and the other retailers opened in early 2016.

Pacific Bondi Beach won the Urban Taskforce award for Development of the Year 2016 on 27 July 2016.

References

External links 

Shopping centres in Sydney
Shopping malls established in 2015
2015 establishments in Australia
Bondi Beach, New South Wales